Jedicke may refer to:

 179P/Jedicke, comet (P/1995 A1)
 269P/Jedicke, comet (P/1996 A1)
 5899 Jedicke, asteroid named for the Peter, June and Robert Jedicke
 Peter Jedicke (born 1955), former president of the Royal Astronomical Society of Canada and namesake of 5899 Jedicke
 Robert Jedicke (born 1963), Canadian astronomer and discoverer of comet 179P/Jedicke